Asesina may refer to:

"Asesina" (Lali Espósito song), 2013 song by Lali Esposito from the album A Bailar
"Asesina" (Brytiago and Darell song), 2018 song by Brytiago and Darell 
"Asesina", 1986 song by Bonny Cepeda